Touffreville-la-Corbeline  is a commune in the Seine-Maritime department in the Normandy region in northern France.

Geography

Heraldry

Population

Places of interest
 The church of St. Martin, dating from the twelfth century.
 Remains of a feudal castle at Bois-de-la-Salle.
 Two chateaux, at Verbosc and Bourg-Naudin.
 A chapel at Verbosc.

See also
Communes of the Seine-Maritime department

References

Communes of Seine-Maritime